William Thomas Lovejoy (1849 – 24 August 1913) was a Member of the Queensland Legislative Assembly.

Early life
Lovejoy was born in Middlesex, England, the son of Thomas Lovejoy and his wife Haligton (née Wildlesea). He arrived in Queensland in 1872 and commenced work as a station hand at Eton Vale. Lovejoy took up a Selection at Meringandan and built the first Hotel there which sold in 1890.

Politics
Winning the seat of Aubigny in 1893, Lovejoy served just 15 months before having to resign in 1894 due to his insolvency.

Later life
Lovejoy became host of the Travellers Home Hotel in Toowoomba and then built The Pioneers Arms, the first hotel in Goombungee. His last home was Spring Grove in the Bell area of the Darling downs. Lovejoy died in 1913 and was buried in Dalby Monumental Cemetery.

References

Members of the Queensland Legislative Assembly
1849 births
1913 deaths
People from Hayes, Hillingdon
British emigrants to Australia